Swing's the Thing is an album by saxophonist Al Sears, recorded in 1960 and released on the Swingville label.

Reception

Scott Yanow of AllMusic wrote: "A fine swing-based tenor who could stomp and honk with the best of them (although he rarely screamed), Sears had relatively few opportunities to record as a leader ... Sears sticks to basic originals, blues, and standards, and is in top form on these swinging and generally accessible performances."

Track listing
All compositions by Al Sears, except where indicated.
 "Moving Out" (Walter Bishop) – 4:29
 "Record Hop" – 4:32
 "Take off Road" – 3:41	
 "Already Alright" – 5:08
 "In a Mellow Tone" (Duke Ellington, Milt Gabler) – 5:30
 "Out of Nowhere" (Johnny Green, Edward Heyman) – 3:04
 "Ain't No Use" (Don Abney) – 6:36
 "The Thrill Is Gone" (Ray Henderson, Lew Brown) – 4:02

Personnel
Al Sears – tenor saxophone
Wally Richardson – guitar
Don Abney – piano
Wendell Marshall – bass
Joe Marshall – drums

References

1961 albums
Al Sears albums
Swingville Records albums
Albums produced by Esmond Edwards
Albums recorded at Van Gelder Studio